Rosemary Victoria Schofield is a British author, biographer, and historian. Her most recent books are a memoir of her thirty year friendship with Benazir Bhutto, a two volume history of the Black Watch and a biography of Sir John Wheeler-Bennett. She also wrote the first full-length biography of Field Marshal Archibald Wavell and edited a memoir of his life and naval career by her late father Vice Admiral B. B. Schofield. She regularly contributes to British national and specialist media.

Life and career 
Victoria Schofield was educated at the Royal Naval School for Girls, and at Lady Margaret Hall (LMH) of Oxford University, from which she holds a degree in Modern History. At LMH she was a close friend of Benazir Bhutto, whom she succeeded as President of the Oxford Union Society. She was the visiting Alistair Horne Fellow at St Antony's College, University of Oxford in 2004-2005.

Schofield is married to Stephen Willis and has three adult children.

Published works 
Bhutto: Trial and Execution. London: Cassell, 1979. .
The United Nations: People, Politics, and Power. Hove: Wayland, 1979. .
Every Rock, Every Hill: The Plain Tale of the North-West Frontier and Afghanistan. London: Pimlico, 1984, 1987. .
Kashmir in the Crossfire. London, Tauris, 1996. .
(ed.) Old Roads, New Highways: Fifty Years of Pakistan. Oxford: Oxford University Press, 1998. .
The House That Fell Down: A Diary of a Domestic Disaster. London: John Murray, 2001. .
Wavell: Soldier and Statesman. London: John Murray, 2006. .
Afghan Frontier: Feuding and Fighting in Central Asia / At the Crossroads of Conflict. London: Tauris Parke, 2003, 2010. .
Kashmir in Conflict: India, Pakistan, and the Unending War. London: Tauris, 2000, 2003, 2010. .
Witness to History: The Life of John Wheeler-Bennett. New Haven: Yale University Press, 2012. .
The Highland Furies: The Black Watch 1739-1899. London: Quercus, 2012. .
The Black Watch: Fighting in the Front Line, 1899-2006. London: Head of Zeus, 2017. .
With The Royal Navy in War and Peace: O'Er the Dark Blue Sea (Editor). London: Pen & Sword, 2018. 
The Fragrance of Tears: My Friendship with Benazir Bhutto. London: Apollo, 2020. .

References

External links 
 .

Living people
Alumni of Lady Margaret Hall, Oxford
British biographers
British military historians
British writers
Writers about the Kashmir conflict
Presidents of the Oxford Union
Year of birth missing (living people)